Knute Hill (July 31, 1876 – December 3, 1963) was a U.S. Representative from the state of Washington. He was known by the nickname "the Little Giant".

Background
Born on a farm near Creston, Illinois to Norwegian immigrant parents, Hill moved to De Forest, Wisconsin in 1877 and later to Red Wing, Minnesota in 1889. He attended both Red Wing Seminary and the University of Minnesota at Minneapolis. He graduated from the law department of the University of Wisconsin–Madison in 1906. He was admitted to the bar the same year and practiced law in Milwaukee and Eau Claire, Wisconsin from 1908 to 1910. He moved to Prosser, Washington in 1911. He taught in the public and high schools of Benton County, Washington from 1911 to 1922. He also engaged in agricultural pursuits and was a founding member of the Washington State Grange.

Political career
Running as a Farmer-Labor Party candidate in 1924 Hill unsuccessfully contested the 4th congressional district seat in Washington. He received over 13 percent of the votes cast.

Hill served as a member of the Washington State House of Representatives from 1927 until 1933. Hill was elected as a Democrat to the Seventy-third and to the four succeeding Congresses. He represented the State of Washington's 4th congressional district from March 4, 1933 – January 3, 1943. He was an unsuccessful candidate for reelection in 1942 to the Seventy-eighth Congress.

Hill was Superintendent of the Uintah-Ouray Indian agency at Fort Duchesne, Utah from 1943 until his resignation on March 31, 1944. Hill was a radio commentator in Spokane, Washington from 1944 to 1946. He was an unsuccessful Independent Progressive candidate for election in 1946 to the Eightieth Congress. Hill served as a consulting appraiser and information clerk in the Bureau of Reclamation, Columbia Basin Project, Ephrata, Washington, from March 1949 until his retirement in 1951.

Later years
Knute Hill died of a heart attack in his cabin in Desert Hot Springs, California. He was interred in the Terrace Heights Memorial Park, in Yakima, Washington. Records and papers associated with his political career are maintained at the Washington State University in Pullman, Washington.

References

External links

 Washington State University Libraries
 Knute Hill register of papers in the Washington State University Library

1876 births
1963 deaths
American people of Norwegian descent
People from Ogle County, Illinois
People from Desert Hot Springs, California
University of Minnesota alumni
University of Wisconsin Law School alumni
Democratic Party members of the United States House of Representatives from Washington (state)
People from DeForest, Wisconsin
People from Red Wing, Minnesota
People from Prosser, Washington
Democratic Party members of the Washington House of Representatives